Comments of the Inner Chorus is English band Tunng's second album, released in late May 2006 on Full Time Hobby Recordings in the UK. The songs "Woodcat" and "Jenny Again" were both released as limited edition singles.

A common theme picked up on by reviewers after the album's release is that of the pastoral and organic. The use of surreal lyrics ("I'll look for a man to turn me into a hare" on the song "Woodcat", for example) led to comparisons to The Wicker Man and Brothers Grimm
 

. The album, much like its 2005 predecessor Mother's Daughter and Other Songs, has noticeable electronica influences leading many to bracket the album, and by extension Tunng, into the folktronica movement.

A limited edition version of the album was also released which contained two extra tracks: "Band Stand" and "Bodies".

Track listing 
 "Hanged" (Mike Lindsay) – 2:01
 "Woodcat" – (Lindsay, Sam Genders) – 3:51
 "The Wind-Up Bird" – (Lindsay) – 4:16
 "Red and Green" – (Genders) – 2:40
 "Stories" – (Lindsay) – 2:47
 "Jenny Again" – (Genders) – 3:22
 "Man in the Box" – (Lindsay, Genders) – 4:56
 "Jay Down" – (Lindsay, Genders, Ashley Bates, Phill Winter) – 3:38
 "It's Because... We've Got Hair" – (Lindsay) – 3:03
 "Sweet William" – (Genders) – 3:35
 "Engine Room" – (Lindsay) – 8:16
 "Band Stand" – 3:03
 "Bodies" – 4:28

Personnel 
 Mike Lindsay – guitars, vocals
 Sam Genders – guitars, vocals
 Ashley Bates – Spanish guitar, bowed banjo, vocals
 Phill Winter – sampler, effects
 Becky Jacobs – vocals, melodica
 Martin Smith – beads, reeds, bells, shells, bones, stones
 Dave Lewis Lloyd – cello
 Sefa – harp
 Detta – flute

Music videos 
Music videos were made for "Woodcat", "Jenny Again" and "It's Because... We've Got Hair".

References

External links 
 Official Tunng discography page containing information about the album.
 Lyrics from the album.

Tunng albums
2006 albums
Full Time Hobby albums